In oncology, the Warburg effect is the observation that most cancer cells produce energy predominantly not through the 'usual' citric acid cycle and oxidative phosphorylation in the mitochondria as observed in normal cells, but through a less efficient process of 'aerobic glycolysis' consisting of high level of glucose uptake and glycolysis followed by lactic acid fermentation taking place in the cytosol, not the mitochondria, even in the presence of abundant oxygen. This observation was first published by Otto Heinrich Warburg, who was awarded the 1931 Nobel Prize in Physiology for his "discovery of the nature and mode of action of the respiratory enzyme". The precise mechanism and therapeutic implications of the Warburg effect, however, remain unclear.

In fermentation, the last product of glycolysis, pyruvate, is converted into lactate (lactic acid fermentation) or ethanol (alcoholic fermentation). While fermentation produces adenosine triphosphate (ATP) only in low yield compared to the citric acid cycle and oxidative phosphorylation of aerobic respiration, it allows proliferating cells to convert nutrients such as glucose and glutamine more efficiently into biomass by avoiding unnecessary catabolic oxidation of such nutrients into carbon dioxide, preserving carbon-carbon bonds and promoting anabolism.

Diagnostically the increased glucose consumption by cancer cells resulting from the Warburg effect is the basis for tumor detection in a PET scan, in which an injected radioactive glucose analog is detected at higher concentrations in malignant cancers than in other tissues.

Warburg's research 
Around the 1920s, Otto Heinrich Warburg and his group concluded that deprivation of glucose and oxygen in tumor cells leads to lack of energy, resulting in cell death. Biochemist Herbert Grace Crabtree further extended Warburg's research by discovering environmental or genetic influences. Crabtree observed that yeast, Saccharomyces cerevisiae, prefers fermentation leading to ethanol production over aerobic respiration, in aerobic conditions and in the presence of a high concentration of glucose - the Crabtree effect. Warburg observed a similar phenomenon in tumors - cancer cells tend to use fermentation for obtaining energy even in aerobic conditions - coining the term "aerobic glycolysis". The phenomenon was later termed Warburg effect after its discoverer. Warburg hypothesized that dysfunctional mitochondria may be the cause of higher rate of glycolysis seen in tumor cells, as well as a predominant cause of cancer development.

Basis 
Normal cells primarily produce energy through glycolysis followed by mitochondrial citric acid cycle and oxidative phosphorylation. However, most cancer cells predominantly produce their energy through a high rate of glycolysis followed by lactic acid fermentation even in the presence of abundant oxygen. Anaerobic glycolysis is less efficient than oxidative phosphorylation for producing adenosine triphosphate and leads to the increased generation of additional metabolites that may particularly benefit proliferating cells. The Warburg effect has been much studied, but its precise nature remains unclear, which hampers the beginning of any work that would explore its therapeutic potential.

Otto Warburg postulated this change in metabolism is the fundamental cause of cancer, a claim now known as the Warburg hypothesis. Today, mutations in oncogenes and tumor suppressor genes are thought to be responsible for malignant transformation, and the Warburg effect is considered to be a result of these mutations rather than a cause.

Driving forces
Older hypotheses such as the Warburg hypothesis suggests the Warburg effect may simply be a consequence of damage to the mitochondria in cancer. It may also be an adaptation to low-oxygen environments within tumors, or a result of cancer genes shutting down the mitochondria, which are involved in the cell's apoptosis program that kills cancer cells.

Fermentation favors cell proliferation

Since glycolysis provides most of the building blocks required for cell proliferation, both cancer cells and normal proliferating cells have been proposed to need to activate glycolysis, despite the presence of oxygen, to proliferate. Inefficient ATP production is only a problem when nutrients are scarce, but anaerobic glycolysis is favored when nutrients are abundant. Anaerobic glycolysis favors anabolism and avoids oxidizing precious carbon-carbon bonds into carbon dioxide. In contrast, oxidative phosphorylation is associated with starvation metabolism and favored when nutrients are scarce and cells must maximize free energy extraction to survive. Such trade-offs can be theoretically associated with  Giffen behavior in economics.

Evidence attributes some of the high anaerobic glycolytic rates to an overexpressed form of mitochondrially-bound hexokinase responsible for driving the high glycolytic activity. In kidney cancer, this effect could be due to the presence of mutations in the von Hippel–Lindau tumor suppressor gene upregulating glycolytic enzymes, including the M2 splice isoform of pyruvate kinase. TP53 mutation hits energy metabolism and increases glycolysis in breast cancer.

The Warburg effect is associated with glucose uptake and utilization, as this ties into how mitochondrial activity is regulated. The concern lies less in mitochondrial damage and more in the change in activity. On the other hand, tumor cells exhibit increased rates of glycolysis which can be explained with mitochondrial damage.

Molecular targets

, scientists had been investigating the possibility of therapeutic value presented by the Warburg effect. The increase in nutrient uptake by cancer cells has been considered as a possible treatment target by exploitation of a critical proliferation tool in cancer, but it remains unclear whether this can lead to the development of drugs which have therapeutic benefit. Many substances have been developed which inhibit glycolysis and so have potential as anticancer agents, including SB-204990, 2-deoxy-D-glucose (2DG), 3-bromopyruvate (3-BrPA, bromopyruvic acid, or bromopyruvate), 3-bromo-2-oxopropionate-1-propyl ester (3-BrOP), 5-thioglucose and dichloroacetic acid (DCA).

A clinical trial for 2-DG [2008] showed slow accrual and was terminated. There is no evidence yet [2012] to support the use of DCA for cancer treatment.

Alpha-cyano-4-hydroxycinnamic acid (ACCA;CHC), a small-molecule inhibitor of monocarboxylate transporters (MCTs; which prevent lactic acid build up in tumors) has been successfully used as a metabolic target in brain tumor pre-clinical research. Higher affinity MCT inhibitors have been developed and are currently undergoing clinical trials by Astra-Zeneca.

Dichloroacetic acid (DCA), a small-molecule inhibitor of mitochondrial pyruvate dehydrogenase kinase, "downregulates" glycolysis in vitro and in vivo. Researchers at the University of Alberta theorized in 2007 that DCA might have therapeutic benefits against many types of cancer.

Pyruvate dehydrogenase catalyses the rate-limiting step in the aerobic oxidation of glucose and pyruvate and links glycolysis to the tricarboxylic acid cycle (TCA). DCA acts a structural analog of pyruvate and activates the pyruvate dehydrogenase complex (PDC) to inhibit pyruvate dehydrogenase kinases, to keep the complex in its un-phosphorylated form. DCA reduces expression of the kinases, preventing the inactivation of the PDC, allowing the conversion of pyruvate to acetyl-CoA rather than lactate through anaerobic respiration, thereby permitting cellular respiration to continue. Through this mechanism of action, DCA works to counteract the increased production of lactate exhibited by tumor cells by enabling the TCA cycle to metabolize it by oxidative phosphorylation. DCA has not been evaluated as a sole cancer treatment yet, as research on the clinical activity of the drug is still in progress, but it has been shown to be effective when used with other cancer treatments. The neurotoxicity and pharmacokinetics of the drug still need to be monitored but if its evaluations are satisfactory it could be very useful as it is an inexpensive small molecule.

Lewis C. Cantley and colleagues found that tumor M2-PK, a form of the pyruvate kinase enzyme, promotes the Warburg effect. Tumor M2-PK is produced in all rapidly dividing cells and is responsible for enabling cancer cells to consume glucose at an accelerated rate; on forcing the cells to switch to pyruvate kinase's alternative form by inhibiting the production of tumor M2-PK, their growth was curbed. The researchers acknowledged the fact that the exact chemistry of glucose metabolism was likely to vary across different forms of cancer; however, PKM2 was identified in all of the cancer cells they had tested. This enzyme form is not usually found in quiescent tissue, though it is apparently necessary when cells need to multiply quickly, e.g., in healing wounds or hematopoiesis.

Alternative models

Reverse Warburg effect 
A model called the "reverse Warburg effect" describes cells producing energy by glycolysis, but which are not tumor cells, but stromal fibroblasts. In this scenario, the stroma become corrupted by cancer cells and turn into factories for the synthesis of energy rich nutrients. The cells then take these energy rich nutrients and use them for TCA cycle which is used for oxidative phosphorylation. This results in an energy rich environment that allows for replication of the cancer cells. This still supports Warburg's original observation that tumors show a tendency to create energy through anaerobic glycolysis.

Inverse Warburg effect 
Another model has been described in tumor cells in an obesity model called Warburg effect inversion. Whereas in the reverse model the stroma of the microenvironment produces energy-rich nutrients, in a context of obesity these nutrients already exist in the bloodstream and in the extracellular fluid (ECF). In this way, highly energetic nutrients enter directly into TCA and later into oxidative phosphorylation, while lactate and glycogenic amino acids take the opposite path to that proposed by Warburg, which is the production of glucose through the consumption of lactate.

Cancer metabolism and epigenetics
Nutrient utilization is dramatically altered when cells receive signals to proliferate. Characteristic metabolic changes enable cells to meet the large biosynthetic demands associated with cell growth and division. Changes in rate-limiting glycolytic enzymes redirect metabolism to support growth and proliferation. Metabolic reprogramming in cancer is largely due to oncogenic activation of signal transduction pathways and transcription factors. Although less well understood, epigenetic mechanisms also contribute to the regulation of metabolic gene expression in cancer. Reciprocally, accumulating evidence suggest that metabolic alterations may affect the epigenome. Understanding the relation between metabolism and epigenetics in cancer cells may open new avenues for anti-cancer strategies.

Warburg effect in non-cancer cells 

Rapid increase in metabolism is needed during activation of T lymphocytes, which reside in peripheral blood containing stable concentrations of glucose. As glucose is plentiful, T-cells are able to switch to fast utilization of glucose using the coreceptor CD28. This CD3/CD28 signaling parallels insulin signaling, as both lead to higher expression of glucose transporter 1 (Glut-1) on the cell surface via the activation of Akt kinase. CD28 signal transduction not only leads to higher glucose uptake but also to an increased rate of glycolysis. Most of the glucose taken up by activated T lymphocytes is metabolised to lactate and dumped out of the cells.

See also
 Overflow metabolism
Oncometabolism

References 

Oncology